Given Owens House, also known as the Donald Hughes Home, is a historic home located near Campbell, Missouri. It was built in 1860 in the Louisiana Tidewater architectural style. It is a one-story frame dwelling constructed of native Cyprus and poplar lumber. It features a full-width verandah. Also on the property is a contributing barn.

It was listed on the National Register of Historic Places in 1983.

References

Houses on the National Register of Historic Places in Missouri
Houses completed in 1860
Buildings and structures in Dunklin County, Missouri
National Register of Historic Places in Dunklin County, Missouri